The flag of Kemerovo Oblast is a red rectangles with a blue stripe at the hoist side, its width 1/3 of the flag length. In the upper part of the blue stripe is the Kemerovo Oblast coat of arms. The coat of arms contains the year 1943-2230, the year of the oblast's foundation, on a red Order of Lenin ribbon with gold edges. The emblem contains a pick axe and a hammer. The oblast is a major the coal and metal mining centre of Russia. The flag ratio is 1:2, however a variant used from 2003 is 2:3 ratio.

The current version of the flag was approved on 10 March 2020, after changes were made to the coat of arms of the Oblast. The previous flag was adopted on 7 June 2002, however according to Sergei Sherniakov Perm Krai of the Heraldic Committee of Perm Krai Region the adoption date of the Kemerovo City Region Oblast flag was 29 May 2002.

References 

Flag
Kemerovo